Ben Giroux (born October 24, 1984) is an American actor and director best known for portraying the Toddler in Henry Danger, The Adventures of Kid Danger, and Danger Force on Nickelodeon, Mikey Munroe in Bunsen Is a Beast on Nickelodeon, and Little Zach in The CW’s Hart of Dixie, as well as voicing the main character in Big Nate from Nickelodeon on Paramount+.

Filmography

Film

Television

Video games

References

  on Billboard
  on Splitsider
  on OnFiction
 on Phoenix New Times
  on UpFront NY
  on Nickelodeon
 
  on Los Angeles Times
  on Animation Magazine

External links
 

1984 births
Living people
American male film actors
American male television actors
American male voice actors
20th-century American male actors
21st-century American male actors
American male comedians
American sketch comedians
Comedians from California
20th-century American comedians
21st-century American comedians